David Taubman is an electrical engineer at the University of New South Wales in Sydney, Australia. He was named a Fellow of the Institute of Electrical and Electronics Engineers (IEEE) in 2015 for his contributions to image and video communications.

Education
Ph.D. in Electrical Engineering, University of California, Berkeley, 1994
M.Sc. in Electrical Engineering, University of California at Berkeley, 1992
B.E. (Medal) in Electrical Engineering, University of Sydney, 1988
B.Sc. in Mathematics and Computer Science, University of Sydney, 1986

References 

Fellow Members of the IEEE
Living people
Australian computer scientists
Academic staff of the University of New South Wales
UC Berkeley College of Engineering alumni
University of Sydney alumni
Year of birth missing (living people)